‘Little Robin Redbreast’ is an English language nursery rhyme, chiefly notable as evidence of the way traditional rhymes are changed and edited. It has a Roud Folk Song Index number of 20612.

Lyrics 
This rhyme is one of the most varied English nursery rhymes, probably because of its crude early version. Common modern versions include:

Little Robin Redbreast
Came to visit me;
This is what he whistled,
Thank you for my tea.

and:

Little Robin Redbreast
Sat upon a tree,
Up went the Pussy-Cat,
And down went he;
Down came Pussy-Cat,
Away Robin ran,
Says little Robin Redbreast—
Catch me if you can.

Little Robin Redbreast jumped upon a wall,
Pussy-Cat jumped after him, and almost got a fall.
Little Robin chirped and sung, and what did pussy say?
Pussy-Cat said Mew, mew mew,—and Robin jumped away.

Origins
The earliest versions of this rhyme reveal a more basic humour. The earliest recorded is from Tommy Thumb's Pretty Song Book (c. 1744), which has the lyric:

Little Robin Red breast,
Sitting on a pole,
Nidde, Noddle, Went his head.
And poop went his Hole.

By the late eighteenth century the last line was being rendered 'And wag went his tail,' and other variations were used in nineteenth-century children's books, in one of the clearest cases of bowdlerisation in nursery rhymes.

Fingerplay
The rhyme has been used as a fingerplay. A version from 1920 included instructions with the lyrics:

Little Robin Redbreast
Sat upon a rail,
(Right hand extended in shape of a bird is poised on extended forefinger of left hand.)
Niddle noddle went his head,
And waggle went his tail.
(Little finger of right hand waggles from side to side.)

Notes

English folk songs
English children's songs
Traditional children's songs
Songs about birds
Songs about cats
1744 songs
Finger plays
English nursery rhymes
Fictional birds
Songwriter unknown